Guiche is a commune in the Pyrénées-Atlantiques department in south-western France.

Popular culture
The play Cyrano de Bergerac by Edmond Rostand features a character known as the Count de Guiche who depicts Antoine III de Gramont, a real-life French marshal from Guiche.

See also
Communes of the Pyrénées-Atlantiques department

References

Communes of Pyrénées-Atlantiques
Pyrénées-Atlantiques communes articles needing translation from French Wikipedia